Asako Tajimi (多治見麻子 Tajimi Asako, born June 26, 1972) is a former Japanese volleyball player.

Clubs
HachioujiJissen High School → Hitachi (1999–2001) → Pioneer Red Wings(2001–2011) → Hitachi Rivale(2011–2012)

National team
 National Team 1990-1999, 2007–2008

Honours
1991 25th Japan Volleyball League New Face award
1992 26th Japan Volleyball League Block award, Best 6
1993 27th Japan Volleyball League Block award, Best 6
2008: 5th place in the Olympic Games of Beijing

References

 

1972 births
Japanese women's volleyball players
Pioneer Red Wings players
Olympic volleyball players of Japan
Volleyball players at the 1992 Summer Olympics
Volleyball players at the 1996 Summer Olympics
Volleyball players at the 2008 Summer Olympics
People from Mitaka, Tokyo
Sportspeople from Tokyo Metropolis
Living people
Asian Games medalists in volleyball
Volleyball players at the 1994 Asian Games
Volleyball players at the 1998 Asian Games
Medalists at the 1994 Asian Games
Medalists at the 1998 Asian Games
Asian Games bronze medalists for Japan
Goodwill Games medalists in volleyball
Competitors at the 1994 Goodwill Games